Duse Nacaratti (22 June 1942 – 23 July 2009) was a Brazilian actress and comedian, known for roles in films, theater productions and telenovelas. She was nicknamed the "Soberana da comédia" by fellow actors.

Biography
She was born in Cataguases, Minas Gerais, on 22 June 1942.

Many of the theater productions in which Nacaratti appeared during her career were written by playwright and dramatist, Nelson Rodrigues. She appeared in two productions of Beijo no asfalto in 1967 and 2001. Nacaratti later appeared opposite actress Malu Mader in "Vestido de noiva" (Wedding Dress). Her last theatrical performance came in the 2008 production of A falecida, which was directed João Fonseca and written by playwright Nelson Rodrigues.

Nacaratti's film credits included O grande mentecapto in 1989, Romance de empregada in 1988, Com licença, eu vou à luta in 1986 and Bete balanço in 1984. Her last film was 2008's Elvis & Madona.

Her television roles included parts in the Brava gente, Site Picapau Yellow and the Chico Anysio Show television series. Other notable performances included Corpo a corpo in 1984, Sol de verão in 1982, Cambalacho in 1986 and Desejos de mulher in 2002. Nacaratti's last television role was in the 2008 television movie, Negócio da China (Business in China) in which she portrayed the character, Aunt Saudade.

Duse Nacaratti died of respiratory failure on 23 July 2009, around 9 A.M. at the Hospital Ipanema Plus in southern Rio de Janeiro, Brazil, at the age of 67.

Filmography

Films
 2008 - Elvis & Madona - Jura
 1987 - Romance da Empregada - Amiga de Fausta
 1986 - Com Licença, Eu Vou à Luta - Teresa

Television
 2008 - Negócio da China - Tia Saudade
 2008 - Faça sua História - senhora que apresenta o novo táxi a Oswaldir
 2007 - Sítio do Picapau Amarelo - Velha Firinfiféia
 2005 - Alma Gêmea - Bruxa
 2002 - Desejos de Mulher - Iracema
 2001 - Brava Gente - Mãe de Marcilene
 1986 - Cambalacho - Cibele Sampaio
 1984 - Corpo a Corpo - Virgínia Mercier
 1982 - Sol de Verão - Madalena
 1982 - Chico Anysio Show - Tiete

References

External links

1942 births
2009 deaths
Brazilian stage actresses
Brazilian television actresses
Brazilian film actresses
People from Minas Gerais
Actresses from Rio de Janeiro (city)